A partial solar eclipse occurred on November 23, 1946. A solar eclipse occurs when the Moon passes between Earth and the Sun, thereby totally or partly obscuring the image of the Sun for a viewer on Earth. A partial solar eclipse occurs in the polar regions of the Earth when the center of the Moon's shadow misses the Earth.

Related eclipses

Solar eclipses 1946–1949

Tritos series

References

External links 

1946 11 23
1946 in science
1946 11 23
November 1946 events